Erquelinnes is a municipality of Wallonia located in the province of Hainaut, Belgium.

Located on the border with France, where the commune of Maubeuge lies, Erquelinnes had a total resident population of 9,549, in 2006.

The municipality consists of the following districts: Bersillies-l'Abbaye, Erquelinnes, Grand-Reng, Hantes-Wihéries, Montignies-Saint-Christophe, and Solre-sur-Sambre.

Heritage

 The Solre-sur-Sambre Castle

References

External links
 

Municipalities of Hainaut (province)